Grahams Corner is a mostly residential neighbourhood in located on the eastern shore of Lake Banook in Dartmouth area of Halifax Regional Municipality, Nova Scotia.

Geography

Schools
Alderney Elementary

References

Communities in Halifax, Nova Scotia
Dartmouth, Nova Scotia